Cerion chrysalis is a species of air-breathing tropical land snail, a  terrestrial pulmonate gastropod mollusk in the family Cerionidae, the peanut snails.

References

Cerionidae
Gastropods described in 1837